Miroslav Milosevic (born September 18, 1985) is an Austrian football defender who last plays for SV Grödig.

External links
 Profile at KSV-Fussball.

1985 births
Austrian people of Serbian descent
Living people
Austrian footballers
SV Grödig players
FC Red Bull Salzburg players
SV Seekirchen players
Kapfenberger SV players

Association football defenders
Footballers from Salzburg